Kyle Sumsion (born 29 October 1993) is an American professional rugby union player. He plays as a flanker for Rugby United New York (RUNY) in Major League Rugby (MLR).

Professional career
In 2014, Sumsion represented the United States national rugby union team. He previously played centre for the Sacramento Express in PRO Rugby in 2016 and the Houston Sabercats in Major League Rugby during the 2018 season.

References

1993 births
Houston SaberCats players
Living people
Rugby New York players
Sacramento Express players
United States international rugby union players
American rugby union players
Rugby union flankers